Yin Junhua (Simplified Chinese:, born 27 August 1990) is a Chinese boxer from Xingtai. She won a silver medal in the women's lightweight event at the 2016 Summer Olympics, losing to Estelle Mossely by split decision in the final.

References

External links
 

1990 births
Living people
People from Xingtai
Sportspeople from Hebei
Chinese women boxers
Boxers at the 2016 Summer Olympics
Olympic boxers of China
2016 Olympic silver medalists for China
Olympic medalists in boxing
Boxers at the 2014 Asian Games
Boxers at the 2018 Asian Games
Asian Games gold medalists for China
Asian Games medalists in boxing
Medalists at the 2014 Asian Games
Medalists at the 2018 Asian Games
AIBA Women's World Boxing Championships medalists
Featherweight boxers
21st-century Chinese women